Denise Parnell (born 11 October 1960) is a British former professional tennis player.

A native of Manchester, Parnell attended Withington Girls' School and was active on the professional tour throughout the 1980s, reaching a best singles world ranking of 308. In 1986 she competed in the singles main draw of the Wimbledon Championships, where she was beaten in the first round by seventh seed Helena Suková.

Parnell is now a tennis referee, officiating in Wimbledon since 2006.

References

External links
 
 

1960 births
Living people
British female tennis players
English female tennis players
Tennis people from Greater Manchester